17th Army can refer to:

17th Army (German Empire)
17th Army (Wehrmacht)
17th Army (Soviet Union)
Seventeenth Army (Japan), a unit of the Imperial Japanese Army